Sachida Nagdev (25 October 1939 – 29 May 2017) was an Indian painter based in central Indian town of Bhopal.

Nagdev is best known for his abstract oil paintings in harmonious colors, though his later works include some representational art including human figures. He was one of the first few Indian artists to experiment fusion of Indian miniature Painting style with modern abstract style. He is a recipient of Shikhar Samman – highest civilian honor bestowed by MP Government.

Early life and education 
At the age of 9, Nagdev started learning from signboard painters and assisting them, often working on movie hoardings and advertisement banners. He then studied fine art at Bharti Kala Bhavan, Ujjain, under the guidance of Dr. V.S. Wakankar, renowned archaeologist and artist. He assisted Dr. Wakankar in discovering and cataloging cave paintings of Bhim Betka – a UNESCO World Heritage Site. Nagdev graduated from Sir J. J. School of Art, Bombay in 1961 and received an M.A. in ancient Indian History and Culture in 1962. In 1970, he was awarded an M.A. in Painting from Vikram University, Ujjain.
 1961 J.J. School of Arts, Bombay
 1962 M.A. in Ancient Indian History and Culture, Vikrarm University, Ujjain
 1970 M.A. in Painting, Vikrarm University, Ujjain

Art career

Nagdev participated in around 40 solo and group exhibitions, in India, Nepal, Germany, Japan, and the UAE. His art works are in many important collections, including the National Gallery of Modern Art, Delhi, India and Osaka Contemporary Art Center, Japan.

Solo exhibitions 
 1976 All India Artist Camp, Bhopal
 1986 Mandu
 1992 Mussorie
 1993 Bijapur
 1993 International Artist Camp Gulbarga
 1981 Gallery Kasahara Osaka, Japan
 1974 Gallery in Amtsgericht Bad Vilbel. W. Germany
 1987 Continental Hotel, Sharjah, U.A.E.
 1973 Maison Des Jeunes, Chamonix, France
 1969 Indian Cultural Centre, Kathmandu
 1967 Royal Art Academy, Kathmandu
 1989 Prague. Czechoslovakia
 1990–93 Osaka Triennale, Japan
 1994 12 Artists, Pao Galleries – Hong Kong Art Centre, Hong Kong organized by Sarala's Art International

Participation in Artist Camps 

 All Indian Artist's Camp Bhopal 1976
 Mandu 1986
 Masoorie, 1992
 Bijapur 1994
 Bharat Bhawan, Bhopal 1996
 Artists Circle Camp at Taj Hotel, Chennai 1997
 Art in Industry Camp, Tata Nagar, Jamshedpur 1998
 International Camp, Gulberga, Karnataka 1993
 Aurodhan Gallery and Shereton Hotel, Chennai 2000
 Aurodhan Gallery and Taj Krishna, Hyderabad 2001
 Art World and Rotary Club as Pondicherry 2001
 Kala Parishad Bhopal 2001
 All India Camp Kurkshetra University, 2003
 India French Artist Camp, Pondicherry, 2005
 National Art Fair, Indore 2005
 National Art Fair, Gwalior 2006

Commissions and collections 
 Osaka Contemporary Art Center, Japan
 National Gallery of Modern Art, New Delhi
 Lalit Kala Academy, New Delhi
 Gallery of Modern Art, Jaipur
 Birla Art Academy, Calcutta
 Citi India Corporate Collection
 State Art Gallery, Bhopal & Gwalior, M.P.
 Sri Chitralayam Art Museum, Kerala
 Roopankar Museum of Modern Art, Bharat Bhawan, Bhopal
 Air India Collection, Bombay
 U.B. House TITAN, Bangalore
 Madhya Pradesh Legislative Assembly, Bhopal

Awards 
 Shankar's International Children's Art Competition, New Delhi 1954, 1955
 All India Tagore Art Exhibition, Indore 1961 (Silver Plaque)
 Scene Art-Exhibition, M.P. 1960, 1962 (Merit Award)
 All India Art Exhibition, Gwalior 1959 (Merit Award)
 All India Kalidas Exhibition, Ujjain 1967 (Merit Award)
 State Art Exhibition, Bhopal 1973 (Best Painting Award)
 All India Ram Charit Manas Exhibition, Bhopal 1976 (Merit Award)
 Yomiuri Telecasting Award, Osaka Triennale, Japan 1990
 Shikhar Samman – highest civilian honor conferred by M.P. Government, 1997 (Lifetime Achievement)

References

External links 
Sachida Nagdev's Homepage
Listing of National Gallery collection including Nagdev
Nagdev's work at an online gallery

1939 births
Indian male painters
Living people
People from Ujjain
Vikram University alumni
Sir Jamsetjee Jeejebhoy School of Art alumni
Abstract painters
20th-century Indian painters
Painters from Madhya Pradesh
20th-century Indian male artists